Bertil von Friesen (1901 - 1990) was a Swedish physician.

1901 births
1990 deaths
20th-century Swedish physicians